148 (one hundred [and] forty-eight) is the natural number following 147 and before 149.

In mathematics
148 is the second number to be both a heptagonal number and a centered heptagonal number (the first is 1). It is the twelfth member of the Mian–Chowla sequence, the lexicographically smallest sequence of distinct positive integers with distinct pairwise sums.

There are 148 perfect graphs with six vertices, and 148 ways of partitioning four people into subsets, ordering the subsets, and selecting a leader for each subset.

In other fields
In the Book of Nehemiah 7:44 there are 148 singers, sons of Asaph, at the census of men of Israel upon return from exile. This differs from Ezra 2:41, where the number is given as 128.

Dunbar's number is a theoretical cognitive limit to the number of people with whom one can maintain stable interpersonal relationships. Dunbar predicted a "mean group size" of 148, but this is commonly rounded to 150.

See also
 The year AD 148 or 148 BC
 List of highways numbered 148

References 

Integers